The flags of the Dutch royal family are a set of flags used to identify a member of the royal family. The current system of flags for the Dutch monarch, princes, and princesses was introduced in 1908.

Background 
The current system of personal flags for the monarch and other members of the royal family was introduced in 1908. In 1907, minor modifications were introduced to the Dutch coat of arms; likewise, a new flag for the Dutch monarch was introduced the following year. These flags are designed by the High Council of Nobility (who are also responsible for heraldry of the royal family) and are granted by royal decree. Like their coats of arms, these flags are usually shared among siblings.

The flags follow a similar pattern and, although not banners of arms, are heavily influenced by heraldry. Flags of those born into the royal family feature a Nassau-blue cross on an orange field, while the colours are reversed for those who marry into the family. Males have near-square flags while those of females are swallowtailed. Elements of an individual's family coat of arms are also incorporated into the flags.

Use 
The flags are used to mark the presence of an individual in certain buildings, when on vehicles (e.g. a car or ship), or in an army unit. The flag of the monarch is flown above Huis ten Bosch Palace in The Hague (the king's private residence) and above Noordeinde Palace in The Hague (the king's official residence) when the monarch is in the Netherlands, but not necessarily when he is actually resident. Besides these two residences, the royal standard is flown above other palaces, castles or estates where and when the King is present.

The flags are never flown at half-mast; during a period of mourning, a black pennon is affixed to the flagpole flying the flag.

Royal standard 
The royal flag, or the royal standard of the Netherlands, is the official flag of the Dutch monarch. This flag is a non-personal distinctive flag and is not changed from reign to reign. The current flag, introduced in 1908, is a square orange flag, divided in four quarters by a nassau-blue cross. These colours refer to the principality of Orange (in France) and the principality of Nassau (in Germany) from which the present royal family originates. 

In the centre of the flag is the lesser coat of arms of the Kingdom (which originates as a composite of features taken from the arms of the house of Nassau and the arms of the Dutch republic) surmounted by a royal crown and surrounded by the insignia of the Grand Cross of the Military William Order. Each quarter shows a bugle-horn which originates in arms of the principality of Orange.

Upon the accession of King Willem-Alexander in 2013, the monarch's flag was slightly modified: Instead of a rosette, a bow is placed in the ribbon of the Military William Order. Furthermore, the tassels on the horns now both hang down. The adjustments were applied on 30 April 2013 immediately after Willem-Alexander ascended the throne

Princes
The standard of a Dutch prince is rectangular in shape and of proportions 5:6. Flags of princes born into the royal family consist of a Nassau-blue cross on an orange field. 

Instead of the hunting horn of Orange in the upper right and the lower left quarters found in the monarch's standard, these are replaced with insignia obtained from the coat of arms of the family of the prince's parent who married into the royal family. 

Unlike the monarch's standard, the coat of arms of the kingdom is not surrounded by the insignia of the Great Cross of the Military Order of William, but is placed within an orange circle which replaces the center of the cross.

Princesses
The flag of a Dutch princess is swallowtailed in shape and of proportions 5:6. Flags of princesses born into the royal family consist of a Nassau-blue cross on an orange field while the flags of princesses by marriage are reversed. 

Unlike the flags for princes, the right side of the flag is devoid of any insignia. However, the left portion of a princess' flag contains the usual hunting horn of Orange and a personal insignia (obtained from the coat of arms of the princess' family married into the royal family) in the upper and lower left quarters of the flag respectively.

Unlike the monarch's flag, the coat of arms is not surrounded by the insignia of the Grand Cross of the Military Order of William, but is placed either within an orange circle which replaces the center of a blue cross, or at the centre of an orange cross.

Consorts
In general, the standard of a prince consort of the Netherlands is a rectangular flag with proportions 5:6 with the colours of the royal standard (i.e. the orange field and blue cross) reversed. The upper left and lower right quarters bear the lion from the Dutch coat of arms (holding arrows in one hand and brandishing a sword on the other) while the other two quarters have a personal figure taken from their personal coat of arms.

In general, the standard of a queen consort, or the wife of a prince of the Netherlands, is a flag in the form of a swallow tail. The two right quarters are empty, the upper left corner bears the orange horn taken from the arms of the Principality of Orange and the lower left quarter has a personal figure, taken from their personal coat of arms.

In both cases, the coat of arms of the kingdom is at the center of the cross.

Sources
Website: Dutch Royal House. English text about the standard
Website: Dutch Royal House. Image of the standard in the Dutch language section.
Website: Dutch Royal House. Standards of the Dutch Royal Family members in the Dutch language section.
 Website: Flags of the World

References

Netherlands
Flags of the Netherlands
Dutch monarchy
Netherlands
Flags displaying animals